Spath Crest is a summit rocks rising to about 1,450 m and marking the northwest end of Du Toit Nunataks, Read Mountains, in the Shackleton Range. It was photographed from the air by the U.S. Navy in 1967 and surveyed by the British Antarctic Survey (BAS) between 1968 and 1971. In association with the names of geologists grouped in the area, it was named by the United Kingdom Antarctic Place-Names Committee (UK-APC) after Leonard Frank Spath (1882–1957), a British paleontologist and stratigrapher whose study of ammonites made possible the correlation of Mesozoic rocks. Spath was also a paleontologist for the British Museum of Natural History from 1912 to 1957.

Mountains of Coats Land